KISV (94.1 FM, "HOT 94.1") is a Rhythmic Top 40 music formatted radio station based in Bakersfield, California. The American General Media outlet broadcasts with an ERP of 4.5 kW.  Its studios are located at the Easton Business Complex in southwest Bakersfield, and its transmitter is located east of the city.

History
The station signed on the air in 1948 as KERN-FM. It was well known in the 1980s as KQXR or Q94 FM. At that time it had a Top 40 format that leaned towards adult contemporary. After taking a beating from then-rhythmic KKXX 105.3FM, the call letters were changed in 1989 to KERN-FM (94 Oldies), along with the format. For the next eight years the station supported an oldies format, specializing in Top 40 music from the years 1955-1974 and featuring syndicated shows such as "Cruisin' America with Cousin Brucie" and "Dick Clark's Rock, Roll & Remember." It performed fairly well in the Arbitron ratings.
But in 1997 the station was relaunched as "The All New KISS 94.1, The Rhythm Of The Valley." That put it back in a battle with KKXX (who would respond by switching signals and relaunching themselves as an R&B/Hip-Hop intensive outlet). The two stations would wage war during its seven-year melee. But in the end it would be KISV who would come out on top, beating KKXX in all the Arbitron books.

However, in 2001 it became worse. When Clear Channel Communications bought KKXX that year it sent a Cease and Desist order to KISV calling the "KISS" moniker trademarked because they want to use the slogan for KKXX, which by then was called simply "X96.5". During its court hearings, KISS 94.1 dropped "Kiss" from its name in compliance with the Cease & Desist order and called itself simply "94.1" for the duration of the fight against Clear Channel. A federal judge agreed and February 2002 Clear Channel won the case. That prompted KISV to change its moniker.

Shortly thereafter, KISV held a contest to let the listeners decide what the new name of the station would be. The result of this contest was the station's brand new listener-chosen moniker: "HOT 94.1."

But despite the name change they continued to beat KKXX (which by then was remonikered as "96.5 KISS-FM") up until its last year of existence in 2004, but a month later they picked up competition from KBDS, who filled the void after the final incarnation of KKXX exited. On November 14, 2008 KISV became the only Rhythmic in the market after KBDS went dark due to financial problems caused by the economic recession, but by May 2015, KLLY would enter the battle after shifting from a Mainstream direction.

Programming
The programming on this station includes local programming starting with Romeo on mornings.  His show features Hollywood Trash.  Program director, J. Reed, is on middays.  His show features the  12 O' Clock Movie Match.  Randy is on in the afternoons.  His show features the 5 O' Clock Traffic Jam with D.J. Wreck in the Mix.   Mo'Nique is on nights.  Her show features the Battle of The Jam, the 4 play at nine, and the 9:30 Flurry Mix.  Art Laboe is on Sunday through Thursday evenings.  James is on late nights.  Weekend fill-in hosts include Kev, D.J. Wreck, Noe G., Buddha, Drewski, and Board Op. Brandon.  The Baka Boyz can be heard Saturday evenings.

References

External links
KISV Station website

Rhythmic contemporary radio stations in the United States
ISV
Radio stations established in 1983
1983 establishments in California